The Superior shoulder suspensory complex (SSSC) is, essentially, a bone and soft-tissue ring secured to the trunk by superior and inferior bony struts from which the upper extremity is suspended. The ring is composed of the glenoid process, coracoid process, coracoclavicular ligament, distal clavicle, acromioclavicular joint, and acromial process.

The superior shoulder suspensory complex is extremely important biomechanically. Each of its components has its own individual functions, it serves as a point of attachment for a variety of musculotendinous and ligamentous structures, it allows limited, but significant movement to occur through the coracoclavicular ligament and the acromioclavicular articulation, and it maintains a normal, stable relationship between the upper extremity and the axial skeleton. Rupture of any two parts of SSSC is considered as "floating shoulder", and is strong indication for surgery.

References

Shoulder